The Society of Composers & Lyricists is an organization founded in 1983 to represent composers and lyricists working in visual media, such as television and film. It sought union status in 1984 after the dissolution of the Composers and Lyricists Guild of America, but the National Labor Relations Board denied the bid on the basis that songwriters were independent contractors. Another attempt to become a union in the 1990s was also unsuccessful. Members of the organization also include orchestrators, arrangers, music supervisors, music agents, music attorneys, music editors, copyists, and audio engineers.

Awards
Since 2020, the Society of Composers & Lyricists has presented annual awards for music in film, television, and other media.

Ceremonies

Categories
Since 2022, the organization presents awards in seven competitive categories:

Outstanding Original Score for a Studio Film

Outstanding Original Score for an Independent Film

Outstanding Original Score for a Television Production

Outstanding Original Song for a Dramatic or Documentary Visual Media Production 
Prior to 2022, a single award was given for Original Song in a Visual Media Production, irrespective of genre.

Outstanding Original Song for a Comedy or Musical Visual Media Production 
Prior to 2022, a single award was given for Original Song in a Visual Media Production, irrespective of genre.

Outstanding Original Score for Interactive Media

David Raksin Award for Emerging Talent

Spirit of Collaboration Award 
In addition, the group presents the non-competitive Spirit of Collaboration Award to a composer and filmmaker team.

Notes

References

External links
 Official website

Arts and media trade groups